Chodkowo may refer to:
Chodkowo
Chodkowo-Działki
Chodkowo Wielkie
Chodkowo-Biernaty
Chodkowo-Kuchny
Chodkowo-Załogi